That's the Question is a British quiz game show that aired on Challenge from 14 May 2007 until 22 June 2007. The programme was hosted by Sarah Cawood.

External links
 

2000s British game shows
2007 British television series debuts
2007 British television series endings
Television series by Sony Pictures Television